Fourth of July is a 2022 American comedy drama film directed by Louis C.K., and written by Louis C.K. and Joe List. The film stars List as Jeff, a New York City-based jazz pianist and recovering alcoholic who visits his family in rural Maine for Independence Day, and confronts them about the emotional traumas he experienced with them starting when he was a child. It was directed and produced by Louis C.K., who self-financed the film.

Fourth of July premiered at New York City's Beacon Theatre on June 30, 2022.

Cast
 Joe List as Jeff
 Sarah Tollemache as Beth
 Bill Scheft as Bill
 Nick Di Paolo as Uncle Kevin
 Robert Kelly as Bobby
 Louis C.K. as Therapist
 Paula Plum as Mom
 Robert Walsh as Dad
 Chris Walsh as Uncle Mark
 Tara Pacheco as Naomi
 Courtland Jones as Brenda 
 Allan Havey as Dentist 
 Liz Miele as Hygienist
 Richard O'Rourke as Grandpa
 Luis J. Gomez as Guy on the Street 2

Reception

Box office
The film earned $218,722 from two theaters in its opening weekend and $16,014 in its second.

Critical response
Reviews of the film have been mixed. On Rotten Tomatoes, the film has a 36% approval rating based on 22 reviews by critics and a 89% approval rating based on over 250 audience reviews. On Metacritic, the film has a score of 40 out of 100, based on reviews from eleven critics, indicating "mixed or average reviews"..

Owen Gleiberman of Variety called Fourth of July "a millennial indie trifle". Glenn Kenny of The New York Times stated that the film goes too far in portraying Jeff's family as terrible people, writing, "The family dynamic here is so unrelentingly brutal that it's an actual shock to see how glib the movie is in papering it over."

Kyle Smith of The Wall Street Journal lauded the film as "one of the best films of the year", calling it "acutely observed".

A number of reviewers unfavorably compared the film to Tracy Letts's 2007 play August: Osage County, which is similarly about an extended rural family forced to confront its dysfunctions.

References

External links
 
 

2022 comedy-drama films
2022 independent films
American comedy-drama films
American independent films
Films about dysfunctional families
Films about pianos and pianists
Films directed by Louis C.K.
Films set in Maine
Films with screenplays by Louis C.K.
Independence Day (United States) films
2020s English-language films
2020s American films